St Albans London Road was one of three railway stations in St Albans, Hertfordshire.

History

The station was opened by the Hatfield and St Albans Railway on 16 October 1865, and passenger services ceased on 1 October 1951.

The station building has been restored, and the trackbed now forms part of the Alban Way, a six and a half-mile-long cycle track from St Albans to Hatfield.

The old station building has been listed Grade II on the National Heritage List for England since June 1994.

Station masters

James Barnes 1865 – 1883 
J. D. Rhodes 1884 – 1888 (formerly station master at Essendine)
Mr Perkins 1888 – 1890  (formerly station master at Meldreth and Melbourn)
Jonas Ellingham 1899 – 1918 (murdered by his wife) 
Ernest Wallis 1919 – 1920  (afterwards station master at Palmers Green)
C. John Whitehead 1920 – 1926
Campbell George Correll 1926- 1934 
George Howlett 1935 – 1941 (also station master of St Albans City railway station)
T. Bond 1946 - 1949
Albert Shaw 1949 - 1951

References

Notes

Sources 
 
 

Disused railway stations in Hertfordshire
Former Great Northern Railway stations
Railway stations in Great Britain opened in 1865
Railway stations in Great Britain closed in 1951
Transport in St Albans
Grade II listed railway stations
Grade II listed buildings in Hertfordshire